Pawlik is a surname. It is a diminutive of the Polish given name Paweł ("Paul"). Pawlik is related to the Czech surname Pavlík.

Notable people with the surname include:

People
 Annemarie Pawlik (1938–2019), Austrian politician
 Bronisław Pawlik (1926–2002), Polish actor
 Eva Pawlik (1927–1983), Austrian figure skater
 Hans Peter Pawlik (died 2012), Austrian painter and author
 Jennifer Pawlik, American politician
 Joseph Richard Pawlik (born 1960), American marine biologist
 Katarzyna Pawlik (born 1989), Polish Paralympic swimmer
 Martina Pawlik (born 1969), German tennis player
 Michał Pawlik (born 1995), Polish footballer
 Włodzimierz Pawlik (born 1958), Polish jazz pianist and composer

References

See also
 

Polish-language surnames